This is a list of notable people born in or associated with the city of Wolverhampton in England.

A

 Antonio Aakeel – (born ca.1985) English actor
 Sir James Adams KCMG (1932–2020) – diplomat; ambassador to Egypt and Tunisia
 Jack Addenbrooke (1865–1922) – football player and manager; his 37-year term as manager of Wolves remains the longest in club history
 George Africanus (c. 1763–1834) – baptised George John Scipio Africanus; West African former slave; became a successful entrepreneur in Nottingham
 Aisha (born 1962) – real name Pamela Ross, roots reggae singer
 Reg Allen (1917–1989) – Academy Award-nominated set decorator
 Frederick W. Allsopp (1867–1946) – newspaperman, author, book collector, co-founder of bookshop; eponym of Allsopp Park, Little Rock, Arkansas
 George Armstrong (1822–1901) – Locomotive Superintendent, Northern Division, Great Western Railway, 1864–1897
 Joseph Armstrong (1816–1877) – Locomotive Superintendent, Northern Division, Great Western Railway, 1854–1864
 Rod Arnold – (born 1952), football goalkeeper, spent the most of his career at Mansfield Town; with 513 first-team appearances, (440 in the league), he is the holder of the club's all-time appearance record.
 Arthur Arrowsmith (1880–1954) – footballer, inside right
 Lindsay Ashford – (born 1959) crime novelist; first woman to graduate from both Queens' College, Cambridge and Cambridge University's Institute of Criminology 
 Tom Aspaul – (born ca.1980) singer/songwriter and producer
 Bill Asprey (born 1936) – footballer (defender) and coach
 Len Astill (1916–1990) – footballer, left wing
 Rebecca Atkinson-Lord – (born ca.1985) – theatre director and writer
 Richard Attwood (born 1940) – winner of 1970 24 Hours of Le Mans; former Formula One driver

B

 Keedie Babb (born 1982) – classical crossover soprano
 Babylon Zoo (formed in 1992) – British electro rock band of the mid-1990s 
 Jono Bacon (born 1979) – software developer; community manager for GitHub
 Ruth Badger (born 1978) – business consultant, runner-up of the 2nd series of The Apprentice
 Diane Bailey MBE (born 1943) – golfer; represented Great Britain and Ireland in Curtis Cup fixtures in 1962 and 1972; captained the team in 1984, 1986 and 1988
 Prof. Chris Baines (born 1947) – environmentalist, gardener, naturalist and TV presenter
 Peter Baker (born 1967) – golfer
 Jack Bannister (1930–2016) – cricketer and commentator
 Frances Barber (born 1958) – actress
 Steve Barnett (born 1952) – chairman and CEO of Capitol Music Group
 George Barney (1792–1862) – Royal Engineer officer who became Lieutenant Governor of the Colony of North Australia, son of Joseph Barney
 Joseph Barney (1753–1832) – artist and engraver
 Dr George Barnsby (1919–2010) – author and socialist scholar
 Tom Barrett (1891–1924) – motor-racing riding mechanic; his death in the 1924 San Sebastian Grand Prix ended the practice of riding mechanics in two-seat racing cars
 Al Barrow (born 1968) – bassist of the British band Magnum
 Dickie Baugh (1864–1929) – footballer, right back who spent the majority of his career with Wolverhampton Wanderers, for whom he played in three FA Cup finals
 Stuart Baxter (born 1953) – 226 caps as a footballer; current manager of South Africa national football team
 Edwin Butler Bayliss (1874–1950) – artist, known for his realistic and unsentimental paintings of industrial sites in the Black Country
 Sir William Maddock Bayliss (1860–1924) – physiologist; co-discoverer of peristalsis of the intestines and the peptide hormone secretin, the first discovered hormone
 Ann Beach (born 1938) – actress
 Miles Beevor (1900–1994) – solicitor, pilot and businessman
 Clinton Bennett (born 1955) – British American scholar of religions and participant in interfaith dialogue, specializing in the study of Islam and Muslim-non-Muslim encounter
 Nigel Bennett (born 1949) – an Anglo-Canadian actor, director and writer
 Kenneth Benton, CMG (1909–1999) – MI6 officer and diplomat 1937–68; after retirement, began a second career as writer of spy and crime thrillers
 Charles Albert Berry (1852–1899) – nonconformist divine
 Gwen Berryman (1906–1983) – played Doris Archer in the BBC radio soap opera The Archers from the first episode in 1951 until 1980
 Dick Betteley (1880–1942) – footballer, defender
 Bibio (born 1978) – professional name of British music producer Stephen Wilkinson
 William Bidlake (1861–1938) – architect; a leading figure of the Arts and Crafts movement in Birmingham; Director of the School of Architecture at Birmingham School of Art
 Lincoln Birch (born 1978) – professional golfer
 Edward Bird R.A. (1772–1819) – artist, early member of the Bristol School
 John Blackburn (1933–1994) – Conservative MP for Dudley West from 1979 to 1994
 Joan Blackham (1946–2020) – actress, Bridget Jones's Diary
 Sue Blane (born 1949) – theatrical costume designer
 Billy Blunt (1886–1962) – footballer who played in the Football League for Wolverhampton Wanderers and Bristol Rovers; became the first Wolves player to score two hat-tricks during a season; twice he scored 4 in games
 George Bradburn (1894–1975) – footballer, played as a centre-half for Southampton and Walsall in the years after World War I
 Henry Brinton (1901–1977) – politician, astronomer and author of 1962 Cold War novel Purple-6
 Peter Broadbent (1933–2013) – England international footballer, midfielder; won major domestic honours with Wolverhampton Wanderers; appeared in the 1958 World Cup; scored the club's first ever goal in European competition when he netted against Schalke in a European Cup tie in November 1958
 Thomas John I'Anson Bromwich (1875–1929) – mathematician, Fellow of the Royal Society 
 Norman Brook (1902–1967) – Cabinet Secretary (1947–1962)
Rt Rev James Brown (1812–1881) – RC Bishop of Shrewsbury (1851–1881)
 Nicholas Budgen (1937–1998) – barrister and politician
 Steve Bull (born 1965) – footballer, striker; holds the club goal-scoring record for Wolves and has a stand named after him at their Molineux Stadium
 Evaline Hilda Burkitt (1876–1955) – first British suffragette to be force-fed
 Tony Butler (born 1935) – radio presenter
 Stephen Byers (born 1953) – cabinet minister and Labour Party politician

C

 Bill Caddick (1944–2018) – folk singer-songwriter and guitarist, member of the group Home Service
 Eddie Chambers (born 1960) – artist, writer, curator and academic
 William Chappell (1907–1994) – dancer, ballet designer, director
 Radzi Chinyanganya (born 1986) – co-presenter of the BBC children's TV programme Blue Peter
 Ben Christophers (born 1969) – singer-songwriter and multi-instrumentalist
 Charles Chubb (1779–1845) and Jeremiah Chubb – lock and safe manufacturers
 Eddie Clamp (1934–1995) – footballer, right half, nicknamed 'Chopper Eddie'
 Wayne Clarke (born 1961) – footballer, striker
 Nick Clewley (born 1983) – cricketer
 Louis Coatalen (1879–1962) – automobile engineer
 B. L. Coombes (1893–1974) – writer, spent most of his working life in the coal mines of the South Wales coalfield, which provided the subject matter for much of his writing.
 John Cooper KC (born 1958) – barrister specialising in human rights and criminal law; broadcaster and politician 
 Leonard Cottrell (1913–1974) – author and journalist
 Ernest Frank Guelph Cox (1883–1959) – electrical and mechanical engineer; marine salvage expert
 Charlotte Craddock (born ca.1988) – field hockey player, youngest member of the British hockey squad for the 2008 Summer Olympics in Beijing
 Garry Crawford (born 1972) – sociologist whose research focuses primarily on audiences and consumer patterns, in particular, sports fans and video gamers
 Steve Cross (born 1959) – footballer, defender / midfielder; played for Shrewsbury Town, Derby County and Bristol Rovers; commentator on BBC Radio Shropshire
 Geoff Crudgington (born 1952) – footballer, goalkeeper
 Stan Cullis (1916–2001) – footballer (defender) and football manager with Wolves; namesake of a stand at their Molineux Stadium
 Ernest Geoffrey Cullwick FRSE OBE (1859–1945) – pioneer of electromagnetism and atomic particles. Director of Electrical Engineering for the Royal Canadian Navy and Director of the Electrical Research Defense Research Board of Canada.

D

 Claire Darke (born ca.1965) – from Stratford-upon-Avon; 161th Mayor of Wolverhampton
 Paul Darke (born 1962) – leading disability rights activist and academic, husband of Claire Darke, lives in Wolverhampton 
 Kevin Darley (born 1960) – jockey, British flat racing Champion Jockey in 2000 (155 wins); co-president of the Jockeys' Association of Great Britain
 Jean Margaret Davenport (1829–1903) – stage actress in England and the US
 Howard R. Davies (1895–1973) – motorcycle racing champion and motorcycle designer
 Mark Davies (born 1988) – footballer currently playing for Bolton Wanderers
 Kirk Dawes QPM (born ca.1957) – Detective Constable with West Midlands Police, founded the Centre For Conflict Transformation, a company trying to reduce gun and gang violence
 Group Captain Montagu Ellis Hawkins "Monty" Dawson DFC & Bar, DFM (1919–2003) – bombardier and navigator
 Christopher Hugh Dearnley LVO (1930–2000) – cathedral organist, director of music, served in Salisbury Cathedral and St Paul's Cathedral
 Narinder Dhami (born 1958) – children's author
 Michael Dibdin (1947–2007) – crime writer
 Derek Dougan (1938–2007) – Northern Ireland international footballer, played for Wolverhampton Wanderers; defender / midfielder / forward; chief executive and later chairman of Wolves, as part of a consortium that saved the club from liquidation
 Rebecca Downes – blues rock singer, guitarist, songwriter and vocal coach
 Spencer Dunkley (born 1969) – basketball player, pivot; coaches in Appoquinimink High School, Odessa, Delaware
 Sheila Dunn (1940–2004) – actress

E

 Catherine Eddowes (1842–1888) – victim of the Whitechapel murders attributed to Jack the Ripper
 Dean Edwards (born 1962) – footballer (forward), football manager
 Major Roland Elcock VC MM (1899–1944) – as corporal he was the recipient of the Victoria Cross, the highest and most prestigious award for gallantry in the face of the enemy that can be awarded to British and Commonwealth forces
 Verona Elder MBE (born 1953) – British, Commonwealth and European medal-winning English 400 metres runner; manager of the British athletics team for people with learning disability
 Edward Elgar (1857–1934) – despite living in Worcester, he was an ardent Wolverhampton Wanderers fan and may have travelled to home games on his bicycle.
 Billy Ellis (1895–1939) – footballer, played in the Football League for Sunderland, Birmingham, Lincoln City and York City as a winger
 Georgia Elwiss (born 1991) – international cricketer, right-arm medium fast bowler and right-handed batsman
 Simon Emmerson (born 1950) – electroacoustic music composer working mostly with live electronics
 Bernard Walter Evans (1843–1922) – landscape painter and watercolourist.
 Sir Walter Evans, 1st Baronet (1872–1954) – hydraulic engineer, politician and public servant; was created a baronet of Wightwick near Wolverhampton

F

 Craig Fallon (1982–2019) – judoka; second male British judoka to simultaneously hold both a World and European title
 Dr Robert William Felkin (1853–1926) – explorer, anthropologist, medical missionary, ceremonial magician, and founder of the Whare Ra lodge
 Ron Flowers (born 1934) – footballer, midfielder; member of England's victorious 1966 World Cup squad; playing at Wolves he won three league championships and an FA Cup; made 515 appearances for the club, scoring 37 times
 sisters Edith Henrietta Fowler (1865–1944) and Ellen Thorneycroft Fowler (1860–1929) – authors
 Henry Fowler, 1st Viscount Wolverhampton (1830–1911) – solicitor and politician
 Henry Fowler, 2nd Viscount Wolverhampton (1870–1943) – peer in the peerage of the United Kingdom; the title became extinct on his death, without issue.
 Richard Fryer (1770–1846) – local banker, landowner and British Whig politician; MP 1832–1835, for Wolverhampton

G

 Trevor Gadd (born 1952) – track cycling champion, competed at the 1976 Summer Olympics, the Commonwealth Games and World Championships
 Alan Garner (1929–1996) – British Labour party activist and trade unionist
 Rex Garner (1921–2015) – actor and director
 Arthur Gaskin (1862–1928) – illustrator, painter, teacher and designer of jewellery and enamelwork; he and his wife Georgie Gaskin were members of the Birmingham Group
 Dr Helen Geake (born 1967) – archaeologist and Anglo-Saxon specialist on archaeological television programme Time Team
 Frank Noel George (1897–1929) – footballer, goalkeeper for Wolverhampton Wanderers; made 242 senior competitive appearances for Wolves
 John Lloyd Gibbons (1837–1919) – engineering surveyor; Justice of the Peace; county councillor for Bilston; Liberal Unionist Party MP for Wolverhampton South, 1898–1900
 Bonaventure Giffard (1642–1734) – Roman Catholic bishop; Vicar Apostolic of the Midland District of England, 1687–1703; Vicar Apostolic of the London District of England, 1703–1734
 Christopher Gill RD (born 1936) – family meat processing business; politician (MP) both Conservative and UKIP
 John Wayne Glover (1932–2005) – British-born Australian serial killer convicted for the murders of six elderly women on Sydney's North Shore; over a 14-month period in 1989–1990, he killed six elderly women, dubbed the "granny killer"
 Karthi Gnanasegaram (born ca.1980) – sports presenter with the BBC; formerly with Sky News, ITN and Al Jazeera's International News Channel in Doha
 Richard Green (born 1967) – footballer, defender
 Mathew Guest (born 1975) - Professor of Sociology of Religion at Durham University
 Button Gwinnett (1735–1777) – signatory of the US Declaration of Independence

H

 Sir Geoff Hampton (born 1952) – head teacher who transformed the fortunes of the first school in Britain which had been deemed by OFSTED inspectors as "failing".
 Johnny Hancocks (1919–1994) – footballer, right wing
 Gilbert Harding (1907–1960) – journalist and radio and television personality
 Neil Harrison (born 1962) – top ranking cricket umpire based in Japan umpired four matches at the 2009 Women's Cricket World Cup
 Billy 'Artillery' Hartill (1905–1980) – footballer, forward; Wolves' top goal scorer for 45 years until the feat was broken by John Richards shortly before Hartill's death
 Jack Hayes (1887–1941) – police officer, trade unionist and politician; served in the Metropolitan Police, general secretary of the National Union of Police and Prison Officers
 Helene Hayman, Baroness Hayman (born 1949) – first Lord Speaker
 Sir Charles William Hayward CBE (1892–1983) – entrepreneur and philanthropist
 Henry John Hayward (1865–1945) – Wolverhampton-born New Zealand theatrical company manager and cinema chain proprietor
 Sir Jack Hayward, OBE (1923–2015) – son of Wolverhampton factory owners; self-made millionaire; benefactor of many charities; fighter pilot in the Second World War; President of Wolverhampton Wanderers F.C.
 Rudall Hayward (1900–1974) – filmmaker
 Norman Heath (1924–1983) – footballer, goalkeeper
 Karl Henry (born 1982) – footballer, defensive midfielder and former Wolves captain.  
 Rachael Heyhoe Flint (1939–2017) – captain of the England Women's Cricket World Cup team in 1973
 Kenny Hibbitt (born 1951) – footballer, midfielder; during his time at Molineux he won 2 League Cups (1974 and 1980, scoring in the 1974 final) and played in the 1972 UEFA Cup Final; played 544 games for Wolves, scoring 114 goals, the second most appearances a player has made in Wolves history
 Benjamin Hicklin JP (1816–1909) – solicitor and Borough Magistrate; the Hicklin test is a legal test for obscenity established by the English case Regina v. Hicklin 
 Sir Alfred Hickman, 1st Baronet (1830–1910) – industrialist and Conservative MP 1885–1906
 Barbara Hicks (1924–2013) – actress
James Higginson (1885–1940) – cricketer who played one first-class game, scored no runs in his only innings (but maintained an infinite batting average on account of remaining not out), and took no wickets or catches
 Alexander Staveley Hill (1825–1905) – barrister and KC, politician (MP); eponym of Stavely, Alberta
 Dave Hill (born 1946) – lead guitarist for the band Slade
 Edward Hill (1843–1923) – prolific artist, poet, songwriter and newspaper correspondent
 Matthew Hislop (born 1990) – footballer, defender
 Noddy Holder (born 1946) – from Walsall, singer/rhythm guitarist for Slade
 Surgeon Rear Admiral John Holford CB, OBE (1909–1997) – medical officer in the Royal Navy; worked for the Ministry of Health, 1965–1974; later senior principal medical officer
 Dave Holland (born 1946) – jazz bassist
 Dave Holland (1948–2018) – drummer with Judas Priest
 Don Howe (born 1935) – football player, coach and manager
 Matthew Hudson-Smith (born 1994) – track and field sprinter, 4×400 metres relay gold medallist at the 2014 Commonwealth Games

I
 Eric Idle (born 1943) – actor and comedian, attended the Royal Wolverhampton School
 David Inshaw (born 1943) – artist, founder member of the Brotherhood of Ruralists

J

 Howard Jacobson (born 1942) – Booker Prize for Fiction-winning author and journalist
 Jamelia (born 1981) – musician, originally from Birmingham, now living in Wolverhampton
 Sir Stephen Jenyns (–1523) – wool merchant; Master of the Merchant Taylors' Company; Mayor of London; founder of Wolverhampton Grammar School
 Charles Jones (1866–1959) – gardener and photographer
 Francis Jones MBE FRS (1914–1988) – physicist who co-developed the OBOE blind bombing system
 Jackery Jones (1877–1945) – footballer, full back; played over 300 games in the Football League for Wolverhampton Wanderers; member of the club's Hall of Fame; made his team debut in 1901, the first of 111 consecutive appearances; as full-back
 Jenny Jones (born 1948) – Labour Party politician
 Mandy Jones (born ca.1975) – Brexit Party politician
 Wayne 'The Wanderer' Jones (born 1965) – darts player
 William Highfield Jones JP (1829–1903) – industrialist, local politician, author and benefactor; built Jones Brothers & Co.; became an alderman and the 25th mayor of Wolverhampton
 Alfred John Jukes-Browne FRS FGS (1851–1914) – British invertebrate palaeontologist and stratigrapher
 Jake Jervis (born 1991) – professional footballer

K

 Lisa Kehler (born 1967) – race walker, competed for Britain at the 1992 & 2000 Summer Olympics
 Chris Kelly (born 1978) – Conservative Party politician
 Jonathan Kemp (born 1981) – professional squash player, represented England
 Karl Keska (born 1972) – 10,000m runner, 8th at 2000 Summer Olympics
 Sir Rupert Alfred Kettle (1817–1894) – barrister, county court judge and arbitrator
 Syma Khalid, Professor of Computational Biophysics in Chemistry at the University of Southampton
 Mervyn King, Baron King of Lothbury (born 1948) – Governor of the Bank of England from 2003 to 2013
 Beverley Knight (born 1973) – soul singer

L

 Stuart Lampitt (born 1966) – cricketer, right-handed batsman and a right-arm medium-pace bowler; took 370 List A wickets in all for Worcestershire, a record for the county
 Michael Langdon (1920–1991) – bass opera singer
 James Langley MBE MC (1916–1983) – Lieutenant Colonel Coldstream Guards, MI9
 Joanne Latham (born 1961) – English former glamour model
 Margery Lawrence (1889–1969) – pseudonym of Mrs. Arthur E. Towle; fantasy, horror and detective fiction author who specialized in ghost stories
 Winifred Lawson (1892–1961) – opera and concert singer
 Jim Lea (born 1949) – musician, member of Slade
 Margaret Lee (born 1943) – actress
 Joleon Lescott (born 1982) – footballer; graduate of the Wolves Academy, the Wolves' supporters Player of the Year (born in Birmingham)
 Sir Richard Leveson (1570–1605) – Vice Admiral of the Fleet for Life, hero of the Battle of Cadiz, 1596
 Denise Lewis – Olympic gold medallist, born in West Bromwich and raised in Wolverhampton
 Ephraim Lewis (1968–1994) – soul/neo-soul and R & B singer and songwriter
 Bob Lilley MM BEM (1914–1981) – founding member of the British Special Air Service; member of the Coldstream Guards; one of the first four men selected by Colonel David Stirling to be a founder member of L Detachment 1st SAS in Middle East HQ Cairo 1940; took part in many special forces operations and missions behind enemy lines in Libya against Italian and German forces during World War II.
 Adrian Littlejohn (born 1970) – footballer, midfielder/forward
 Anita Lonsbrough (born 1941) – gold medallist in swimming at the 1960 Summer Olympics, now lives in Tettenhall
 Augustus Edward Hough Love (1863–1940) – mathematician worked on the theory of elasticity and mathematical known as Love waves
 Des Lyttle (born 1971) – footballer (defender), football manager and coach

M

 Macka B – (born 1966) as Christopher MacFarlane, reggae artist, performer and Rastafari
 Alan Lindsay Mackay FRS (born 1926) – crystallographer; made scientific contributions related to the structure of materials; predicted quasicrystals in 1981 
 John Malam (born 1957) – historian, archaeologist and author of children's non-fiction informational books
 Sir Charles Arthur Mander, 2nd Baronet JP, DL, TD (1884–1951) – public servant, philanthropist, manufacturer; managing director of Mander Brothers, the family paint, varnish and inks business established in 1773
 Sir Charles Marcus Mander, 3rd Baronet (1921–2006) – industrialist, property developer, landowner and farmer; known as Marcus Mander
 Sir Charles Tertius Mander (1852–1929) – manufacturer, philanthropist and public servant
 Sir Geoffrey Le Mesurier Mander (1882–1962) – chairman of Mander Brothers; Liberal MP for Wolverhampton East; donor of Wightwick Manor to the National Trust
 Miles Mander (1888–1946) – early Hollywood film actor, director and novelist
 Sir Nicholas Mander, 4th Baronet (born 1950) – British baronet; Fellow of the Society of Antiquaries
 Rob Marris (born 1955) – solicitor, politician and MP
 John Marston (1836–1914) – founder of the Sunbeam company, in Upper Villiers Street
 Scott Matthews (born 1976) – singer-songwriter
 John McHugh (1912–2002) – operatic tenor known for ballads and romantic tunes and lyrics
 Pat McFadden (born 1965) – MP for Wolverhampton South East
 Maria Miller (born 1964) – politician, MP and marketing consultant
 Mil Millington – journalist and novelist
 Caitlin Moran (born 1975) – broadcaster and columnist, grew up in Wolverhampton
 Geoffrey Moreland (1914–1996) – footballer, centre forward
John Morton (1925-2021) -  head of the Musicians Union in London (1971-1990) and president of Federation of International Musicians (1973-2004) 
 Jimmy Mullen (1923–1987) – spent his whole career, 1938–1959, playing for Wolverhampton Wanderers FC.; also played for England 12 times

N
 Laura Newton (born 1977) – international cricketer; played for Wolverhampton and Staffordshire
 Johnny Nicholls (1931–1995) – footballer, inside forward
 Alfred Noyes (1880–1958) – poet

O
 Jacqui Oatley  (born 1975) – sports broadcaster
 Sean O'Connor (1981) – professional footballer, 2008 Scottish Cup finalist
 Sean O'Driscoll (born 1957) – footballer, midfielder, and football manager
 Mark O'Shea (born 1956) – herpetologist, photographer, author, lecturer and TV personality

P

 Sara Page (1855–1943) – artist, portrait and figurative painter
 Dee Palmer (born 1937) – formerly David Palmer; composer, arranger, and keyboardist; known for having been a member of the rock group Jethro Tull
 The Right Reverend Philip Pargeter (born 1933) – Titular Bishop of Valentiniana; retired Auxiliary Bishop of the Roman Catholic Archdiocese of Birmingham
 Phil Parkes (born 1947) – football goalkeeper; Wolverhampton Wanderers' first-choice keeper for much of late 1960s and early 1970s; appeared in 127 consecutive league matches, breaking Noel George's club record.
 Derek Parkin (born 1948) – football player, full back; made 609 appearances for Wolverhampton Wanderers (a record); in 1968, became the most expensive full back in Britain when he joined Wolves for £80,000
Florence Paton (1891–1976) – Labour Party politician; MP from 1945 to 1950
 Suzanne Paul (born 1957) – winner of New Zealand's Dancing with the Stars 2007
 Liam Payne (born 1993) – contestant on The X Factor in 2010; singer-songwriter and former member of boyband One Direction
 Jonathan Pedley (born 1962) – leading UK authority on wine
 Andrew Pelling (born 1959) – politician; Conservative then independent MP
 Brian Pendleton (1944–2001) – rhythm guitarist with The Pretty Things in the sixties
 Jonn Penney (born 1968) – singer of Ned's Atomic Dustbin
 Dora Penny (1874–1964) – daughter of the Rector of Wolverhampton; a good friend of Edward Elgar and his family; immortalised as Dorabella in the Enigma Variations
 Fred Pentland (1883–1962) – footballer (forward) and football manager (including Germany (Olympic team), France, Athletic Bilbao, Atlético Madrid, Real Oviedo)
 Pauline Perry, Baroness Perry of Southwark (born 1931) – educationalist; Conservative politician; Her Majesty's Chief Inspector of Schools in England
 Shaun Perry (born 1978) – rugby union footballer, played scrum half
 Suzi Perry (born 1970) – television presenter
 Tom Phillips CBE R.A. (born 1937) – artist, painter, printmaker, collagist
 Tom Phillipson (1898–1965) –  footballer, several goal-scoring records for Wolverhampton Wanderers; became a businessman in Wolverhampton and town mayor.
 George Phoenix (1863–1935) – Victorian/Edwardian landscape, figurative, and portrait artist and sculptor
 Bob Plant (1915–2011) – soldier, recipient of MC
 Robert Plant (born 1948) – singer in Led Zeppelin, born in West Bromwich
 Clive Platt (born 1977) – footballer, striker
 Hugh Porter (born 1940) – Olympic cyclist, broadcaster and media personality
 Lisa Potts – teacher and George Medal holder
 Don Powell (born 1946) – born in Bilston, drummer for Slade
 Enoch Powell (1912–1998) – politician (Member of Parliament for Wolverhampton South West 1950 – Feb 1974), poet, scholar and soldier
 Hayley Price (born 1966) – gymnast, competed in the 1984 Summer Olympics in Los Angeles
 Ken Purchase (1939–2016) – politician, local MP

R
 Paul Raven (1961–2007) – musician and bass player
 William Regal (born 1968) – WWE/WCW/ECW wrestler and commentator; member of The Blue Bloods
 Oscar Gustave Rejlander (1813–1875) – set up as a portraitist in Wolverhampton, around 1846; "father of art photography"
 Emma Reynolds (born 1977) – politician (MP)
 John Rhodes (born 1927) – racing driver
 Mark Rhodes (born 1981) – singer and television presenter; known for TMi, Copycats and Pop Idol 2
 John Richards (born 1950) – international footballer, striker for Wolverhampton Wanderers, where he broke the club's goal-scoring record ending with 194 goals; later returned to Wolves as managing director from 1994 to 2000.
 The Rt Revd Barry Rogerson (born 1936) – first Bishop of Wolverhampton, 1979–1985; formerly vicar of St Thomas' Church, Wednesfield
 Carina Round (born 1979) – singer-songwriter
 Kevin Rowland (born 1953) – singer in Dexys Midnight Runners
 Arthur Rowley (1926–2002) – footballer, inside left and football manager
 Jack Rowley (1920–1998) – footballer, forward and football manager
 Sir Merton Russell-Cotes (1835–1921) – Mayor of Bournemouth, 1894–1895, the only mayor of Bournemouth who was not also a member of the council

S

 Wendy Sadler  (born 1974) – science communicator and lecturer; founded Science Made Simple, which engageds audiences with the physical sciences.
 Tessa Sanderson (born 1956) – gold medallist in the javelin throw, 1984 Summer Olympics
 Sathnam Sanghera (born 1976) – journalist and author
 Scarlxrd (born 1994) – rap artist, rock/metal artist
 Keith Short (1941–2020)– sculptor, worked in the UK feature film industry
 Bill Shorthouse (1922–2008) – professional football player and coach; spent his playing career with Wolverhampton Wanderers
 George Showell (1934–2012) – footballer, played for Wolverhampton Wanderers, Bristol City and Wrexham; mainly with Wolverhampton Wanderers, featuring in two league championship-winning seasons and in the 1960 FA Cup Final.
 Robert of Shrewsbury (died 1212) – Bishop of Bangor from 1197 to his death
 Jarnail Singh (born 1962) – football referee who officiated in the Football League
 Bill Slater CBE (1927–2018)– international footballer, inside forward / defender mainly for Wolverhampton Wanderers; in the same year was voted Footballer of the Year; in 1982, he was awarded an OBE for services to sport; a CBE followed in 1998. 
 Nigel Slater (born 1956) – food writer and journalist
 John Sleeuwenhoek (1944–1989) – footballer, centre-half; made 226 appearances in the Football League for Aston Villa; capped twice for England at under-23 level
 Dean Smith (born 1988) – racing driver; 2009 champion of the British Formula Renault Championship; winner of that year's McLaren Autosport BRDC Award
 Eleanor Smith (born 1957) – the Labour Member of Parliament (MP) for Wolverhampton South West from 2017 to 2019.
 Harry Smith (born 1932) – footballer, left back
 Jack Smith (1882–??) – footballer, forward; scored 39 goals in 110 appearances playing for Wolverhampton Wanderers and Birmingham
 Vikram Solanki (born 1976) – England and Worcestershire cricketer
 Philip Solomon (born 1951) – spiritualist medium, author, broadcaster and paranormal researcher
 John Hanbury Angus Sparrow (1906–1992) – academic, barrister, book-collector and Warden of All Souls College, Oxford, 1952–77
 Mark Speight (1965–2008) – television presenter
 Roger Squires (born 1932) – world's most prolific crossword compiler
 Percy Stallard (1909–2001) – racing cyclist; founder of the British League of Racing Cyclists; as organiser of the 1942 Wolverhampton-Llangollen race, the father of massed-start cycle racing on public roads in Britain
 Derek Statham (born 1959) – footballer, full back
 Josef Stawinoga (1920–2007) – local hermit
 Richard Stearman (born 1987) – footballer, centre back, right back 
Paul Sterling (born 1964) – English/Welsh rugby league footballer of the 1990s and 2000s. He played for England and Wales as a 
 Stevens family – Joe Stevens, father of Harry, George, Albert John ('Jack'), and Joe Stevens Junior; engineers, Stevens Screw Company Ltd and later A J Stevens & Co (AJS) motorcycles
 Dave Swift (orn 1964) – bassist with Jools Holland's Rhythm and Blues Orchestra
 Meera Syal (born 1961) – comedian, writer, playwright, singer, journalist, producer and actress
 Jane Stevenson, (born 1971) – MP for Wolverhampton North East since 2019

T

 Mandy Takhar (born ca.1988) – British Indian model and actress, predominantly appears in Punjabi films
 Kalbir Takher (born 1968) – field hockey player, participated for Great Britain in Field hockey at the 1996 Summer Olympics
 James Tandy (born 1981) – former cricketer
 James W. Tate (1875–1922) – songwriter, accompanist; composer and producer of revues and pantomimes
Jack Taylor (1930–2012) – referee, 1974 FIFA World Cup final
 Andy Tennant (born 1987) – professional track and road racing cyclist
Dame Maggie Teyte (1888–1976) – soprano, creator of role of Melisande in Debussy's Pelléas et Mélisande; younger sister of James W. Tate
 Kristian Thomas (born 1989) – British artistic gymnast; member of the Earls gymnastics club; educated at St Edmund's Catholic School, Wolverhampton
 George Rennie Thorne (1853–1934) – solicitor and politician
 Thomas Tomkis or Tomkys (c. 1580–1634) – playwright of the late Elizabethan and the Jacobean eras; one of the more cryptic figures of English Renaissance theatre
 Billy Tuft (born 1874) – footballer, full back
 Professor Herbert Turnbull (1885–1961) – mathematician
 Syd Tyler (1904–1971) – footballer, full back

U
 Evelyn Underhill (1875–1941) – mystic and Anglican writer

V
 Hugh Vallance (1905–1973) – footballer, centre forward; held a club record for goals scored in a season at Brighton and Hove Albion, the record eventually broken three years after his death.
 Joseph Vickers de Ville (1856–1925) – painter of landscapes and rural subjects
 Sir Charles Pelham Villiers (1802–1898) – member of Parliament for 63 years, holding the record for being the longest serving MP in Parliamentary history; a statue of him stands in West Park in Wolverhampton.

W

 George Wallis, FSA (1811–1891) – artist, museum curator and art educator, first Keeper of Fine Art Collection at South Kensington Museum (Victoria & Albert Museum, London)
 David Watkins (born 1940) – designer of London 2012 Olympics medal; special effects maker for the film 2001: A Space Odyssey
 Stuart Watkiss (born 1966) – footballer (defender) and football manager
 Mickey Wernick (born 1944) – professional poker player
 Sir Charles Wheeler (1892–1974) – sculptor, former president of the Royal Academy
 Fred White (1916–2007) – footballer, goalkeeper
 Willard Wigan (born 1957) – sculptor, creates microscopic sculptures
 Jonathan Wild (1683–1725) – self-penned Chief Thieftaker General of Great Britain and Ireland
 Harry Wilding (1894–1958) – footballer, centre half; played for the Grenadier Guards, Chelsea, Tottenham Hotspur and Bristol Rovers
 Ashley Williams (born 1984) – footballer, defender
 Bert Williams (1920–2014) – spent his career, 1945–1959, playing for Wolverhampton Wanderers FC; also played for England 24 times.
 Charles Williams (1887–1971) – Track and field athlete who competed in the 1908 Summer Olympics in London
 Gary Williams (born 1960) – footballer, won European cup with Aston Villa; played for Leeds, Bradford and Watford
 John Williams (born 1951) – A&R executive, record producer, photographer, manager, recording artist, songwriter 
 Paul Willis (born 1945) – social scientist, major contemporary figure in sociology and cultural studies
 Marty Wilson (1957–2019) – professional poker player; biggest win was $171,000
 Tony Wilson (born 1964) – boxer, British light heavyweight champion, competed at the 1984 Summer Olympics
 Pete Winkelman (born 1957) – chairman of football club Milton Keynes Dons, property developer and former CBS Records executive
 Sam Winnall (born 1991) – footballer, striker, joined Wolves Academy, plays for Sheffield Wednesday
 William Wood (1671–1730) – lived at The Deanery, a large house in Wolverhampton; was given a contract as a mintmaster to strike an issue of Irish coinage, 1722–1724; this coinage was extremely unpopular as a result of the publication of Jonathan Swift's Drapier's Letters and was recalled
 Billy Wright (1924–1994) – captain of England and Wolverhampton Wanderers; for a long time, the most capped English football player; 490 caps for Wolves and 105 caps for England
 Billy Wright (1960–1997) – Wolverhampton-born prominent Ulster loyalist
 David Wright (born 1944) – British diplomat, UK Ambassador to Japan 1996–1999.
 Lady Wulfrun (c. 935–1005) – Anglo-Saxon noble woman and landowner, established a landed estate at Wolverhampton in 985.

Y
 Alison Young (born 1987) – sailor; competed in the Laser Radial class event at the 2012 Summer Olympics
 Percy M. Young (1912–2004) – musicologist, writer and composer

References

Wolverhampton